List of the National Register of Historic Places listings in Madison County, New York

This is intended to be a complete list of properties and districts listed on the National Register of Historic Places in Madison County, New York.  The locations of National Register properties and districts (at least for all showing latitude and longitude coordinates below) may be seen in a map by clicking on "Map of all coordinates".  Three properties are further designated a National Historic Landmarks.



Listings county-wide

|}

See also

National Register of Historic Places listings in New York

References

Madison County, New York